Casimiro may refer to:

Casimiro (given name)
Casimiro (surname)